Konsta Mesikämmen (born 14 November 1993) is a Finnish professional ice hockey defenceman. He is currently a free agent.

Mesikämmen previously played ten games in Liiga for Lukko during the 2017–18 season. He joined HK Dukla Michalovce on May 30, 2019.

His grandfather Ilkka Mesikämmen played in the 1964 Winter Olympics for Finland.

References

External links

 

1995 births
Living people
HK Dukla Michalovce players
Finnish ice hockey defencemen
Imatran Ketterä players
KeuPa HT players
Lukko players
Sportspeople from Turku
HK Dukla Trenčín players
MHk 32 Liptovský Mikuláš players
GKS Tychy (ice hockey) players
Chamonix HC players
Finnish expatriate ice hockey players in Slovakia
Finnish expatriate ice hockey players in France
Finnish expatriate ice hockey players in Poland